Raquel Miller (born May 1, 1978), better known by her stage name Mercedes, is an American singer, rapper and R&B recording artist from Detroit, MI. She is best known for being signed to No Limit Records.

Music career

1997: Music beginnings, Rear End
On May 29, 1999, during an interview Mercedes discussed how she got signed to No Limit, clarifying she was born and raised in Detroit, Michigan, and was in her second year at Xavier University in New Orleans when No Limit group Kane & Abel saw her perform Shirley Murdock's "As We Lay" in a talent show. Impressed by her performance, the No Limit group invited Mercedes to join them in the studio, where she subsequently met No Limit owner Master P. The label CEO asked her to sing "and I’ve been with them ever since" stated Mercedes. On June 29, 1999, Mercedes would release her debut album entitled Rear End it would be released on Master P's No Limit Records; as was typical for No Limit's releases at the time, the album featured other No Limit performing artists such as Mystikal, Mac, Mia X, Silkk the Shocker and Master P. Rear End was reasonably successful, peaking at No. 34 on the Billboard 200 and No. 12 on the Top R&B/Hip-Hop Albums charts. After releasing the album, Mercedes reportedly retired from the music business less than a year later to attend law school.

Discography

Studio albums

Soundtrack albums

Singles

As lead artist

As featured artist

Collaboration singles

References

1978 births
Living people
21st-century American rappers
African-American women rappers
African-American women songwriters
American hip hop singers
American rhythm and blues singer-songwriters
Midwest hip hop musicians
No Limit Records artists
Priority Records artists
Rappers from Detroit
Rhythm and blues musicians from New Orleans
Singer-songwriters from Louisiana
21st-century African-American women singers
20th-century African-American women singers
Singer-songwriters from Michigan
21st-century women rappers